The Mountain West Conference first sponsored football in 1999. This is a list of its annual standings since establishment.

Standings

References

Mountain West Conference
Standings